The Superstar Chef Challenge is a reality/competition special produced for the Food Network Canada. Filmed at the Compass Group Canada Culinary Arts Demonstration Theatre and Kitchen Laboratory in Humber College's North Campus, it served as a pilot for a potential series.

Description 
Hosted by Kevin Brauch (The Thirsty Traveler), the chefs were selected from a participants who sent in a five-minute tape of themselves cooking their signature dish. The winner for the first season was Dana McIntyre and as part of the prize she got a co-starring role in the Food Network Canada show Just One Bite. The show's supervising producer was Jenna Keane. The special was filmed during Humber College's March 2005 Reading Week.

See also 
 MasterChef Canada, series of cooking elimination competition TV shows

External links 
 Food Network Superstar Chef Challenge

Humber College
Food Network original programming
2005 Canadian television series debuts
2000s Canadian reality television series